Pierre Veltz (born 1945) is a French academic.

Veltz holds an engineering degree from École Polytechnique and a PhD in social sciences from École des Hautes Études en Sciences Sociales'''. After beginning his career as an urban planner, he went into academic life and consulting. He founded and headed LATTS, an interdisciplinary research group, at the crossroads of technical and sociological research. From 1981 to 1991, he was the Dean of Research at the Ecole Nationale des Ponts et Chaussées, one of the leading French Grandes écoles. From 1999 to 2004, he was the Director of this School. He also chaired ParisTech, which is a group of ten foremost engineering schools in Paris.

At present, he is Professor at the Ecole des Ponts and Associate Professor at Sciences Po Paris (Centre de sociologie des organisations). He is also the director of IHEDATE (Institut des Hautes Etudes pour le Développement et l’Aménagement des Territoires en Europe). His fields of research are: urban development and planning, economic geography, management and the transformations of organizational structures.

Published works
 Des territoires pour apprendre et innover, Editions de l'Aube / Editions Charles Léopold Mayer, 1994,
 Mondialisation, villes et territoires : une économie d'archipel, PUF, 1996 (nouvelle édition en poche, réactualisée, à paraître en avril 2005)
 Le nouveau monde industriel, Gallimard, avril 2000
 Des lieux et des liens. Politique du territoire à l'heure de la mondialisation, Ed. de l'Aube, 2002
 Le grand tournant : Nord-Pas-de-Calais 1975-2005'', avec L. Davezies, Ed. de L’Aube, 2005
 Faut-il sauver les grandes écoles ?, Presses de Science Po, 2007
 La grande transition , Seuil, 2008 (La France dans le monde qui vient)

External links
 Website of Pierre Veltz

1945 births
Living people
People from Phalsbourg
École Polytechnique alumni
École des Ponts ParisTech alumni
Academic staff of École des Ponts ParisTech
20th-century French non-fiction writers